"The Rich Boy" is a short story by American writer F. Scott Fitzgerald. It was included in his 1926 collection All the Sad Young Men. "The Rich Boy" originally appeared in two parts, in the January and February 1926 issues of Redbook. In the January installment, the story is described on the front cover as: "A great story of today's youth by F. Scott Fitzgerald".

Plot summary 
F. Scott Fitzgerald's "The Rich Boy" is a short story about Anson Hunter, a very affluent young man. Anson was born rich and has always enjoyed a life of privilege, including being tutored by a British nanny in the hopes that her accent and manner of speaking might rub off...

Background and composition 

Fitzgerald wrote "The Rich Boy" in 1924, in Capri, while awaiting publication of The Great Gatsby. He revised it in his apartment at 14 Rue de Tilsitt in Paris the following spring, during what he described as a period of "1000 parties and no work." By May 28, 1925, he wrote his literary agent, Harold Ober, that the story was "at the typist." Five weeks later, he sent  his editor Max Perkins a proposed list of stories for his third collection, describing "The Rich Boy": "Just finished—serious story and very good."

The Fitzgerald scholar Matthew Bruccoli describes the story as "an extension of The Great Gatsby, enlarging the examination of the effects of wealth on character." The story of Anson Hunter and his love for the "dark, serious beauty" Paula Legendre, Fitzgerald modeled the Rich Boy of his title on Princeton classmate Ludlow Fowler, who'd stood as best man at Fitzgerald's wedding. 

Fitzgerald sent Fowler the story before publication and wrote that "I have written a 15,000 word story about you called 'The Rich Boy'—it is so disguised that no one except you and me and maybe two of the girls concerned would recognize, unless you give it away, but it is in large measure the story of your life, toned down here and there and simplified. Also many gaps had to come out of my imagination. It is frank, unsparing but sympathetic and I think you will like it—it is one of the best things I have ever done." Fowler requested excisions that Fitzgerald made before the story was collected in All the Sad Young Men the following year.

Fitzgerald's friend the writer Ring Lardner—dedicee of All the Sad Young Men—was such an admirer  he told Fitzgerald he wished he could have expanded the story to novel length. Fitzgerald explained to Max Perkins that this "it would have been absolutely impossible for me to have stretched 'The Rich Boy' into anything bigger than a novelette."

Critical reception 
Fitzgerald scholar Matthew J. Bruccoli hailed the short story as "Fitzgerald's most important novelette," and "one of Fitzgerald's major stories." In his biography, Bruccoli continues: 
Bruccoli also notes the story contains Fitzgerald's "most promiscuously misquoted sentence: 'They are different from you and me.'" Fitzgerald's actual passage runs:
 The story's first lines are also, as Bruccoli points out, among the author's most famous:

References

Citations

Works cited

External links 
 F. Scott Fitzgerald Centenary Matthew J. Bruccoli Collection at the University of South Carolina
 The New York Times Book Review in March, 1926, on All the Sad Young Men

Short stories by F. Scott Fitzgerald
1926 short stories
1920s short stories
American short stories